The China–South Korea football rivalry is a sports rivalry between the men's national association football teams of each country. The rivalry is commonly referred to as Konghanzheng or Korea-fearing symptom due to how common it is for the China national team to lose to the South Korea national team. Over the 35 official matches they have played against each other, China has only won twice.

Overview
The term "Konghanzheng" literally means "the symptom of fearing Korea". This term was originally used by the Chinese mass media and was later adopted by the Korean media as well. While this term may be seen as an effort to diminish the achievements of the Korean side, the Chinese media has historically taken a positive attitude acknowledging the Korean team's preeminence among East Asian sides.

In Korea, this term is often used as a general term for national victory, as when Korean baseball fans express a desire to create Koreaphobia among the Japanese. This concept is also paired with the Korean Wave (Hallyu) in Korean discourse regarding their relationship with China and other Asian countries.

Lin Xiaohua, the vice chairman of Chinese Football Association said before the match on 10 February 2010, "Koreaphobia comes from the differences in ability, now that becomes much narrower. Therefore, if the mentality is enhanced, our team can overcome Koreanphobia". He also said that the association will invite psychotherapists for the China national football team to cope with the psychological pressure and defeatism for the future. Immediately after his announcement, China defeated South Korea for the first time in their history.

On 23 March 2017, China PR defeated South Korea for the first time in an official FIFA competitive match by a score of 1–0 in the 2018 FIFA World Cup qualification tournament.

Head-to-head record

List of matches
South Korea's score displayed first.

See also 
Anti-Chinese sentiment in Korea
Anti-Korean sentiment in China
Eul-yong Ta
China national football team records and statistics
South Korea national football team records and statistics

References

External links
 RSSSF archive list of all Korea-China internationals up to 2003 
 KFA website all-times results 

China PR
China national football team rivalries
International association football rivalries
China–South Korea relations
1978 establishments in Asia
Sports-related curses